Rhodesdale is an unincorporated community in Dorchester County, Maryland, United States. Rhodesdale is located at the intersection of Maryland routes 14 and 331, north of Vienna and west of Brookview.

References

Unincorporated communities in Dorchester County, Maryland
Unincorporated communities in Maryland